Rhopalovalva lascivana is a species of moth of the family Tortricidae. It is found in China (Guizhou), Korea, Japan and the Russian Far East.

The wingspan is 15–18 mm.

The larvae feed on Quercus mongolica.

References

Moths described in 1881
Eucosmini